Genista tinctoria, the dyer's greenweed or dyer's broom, is a species of flowering plant in the family Fabaceae. Its other common names include dyer's whin, waxen woad and waxen wood. The Latin specific epithet tinctoria means "used as a dye".

Description
The alternate, nearly sessile leaves are glabrous and lanceolate. Golden yellow pea-like flowers are borne in erect narrow racemes from spring to early summer. The fruit is a long, shiny pod shaped like a green bean pod.

Distribution and habitat
This species is native to meadows and pastures in Europe and Turkey.

Properties and uses
Numerous cultivars have been selected for garden use, of which 'Royal Gold' has gained the Royal Horticultural Society's Award of Garden Merit.

The plant, as its Latin and common names suggest, has been used from ancient times for producing a yellow dye, which combined with woad also provides a green colour.

It was from this plant that the isoflavone genistein was first isolated in 1899; hence the name of the chemical compound. The medicinal parts are the flowering twigs.

The plant has been used in popular medicine and herbalism for various complaints, including skin diseases, even in modern times.

Gallery

References

External links

tinctoria
Flora of Europe
Flora of the Northeastern United States
Medicinal plants of Asia
Medicinal plants of Europe
Plant dyes
Plants described in 1753
Taxa named by Carl Linnaeus
Flora without expected TNC conservation status